Alexander Mironov  (born 22 January 1984) is a Russian professional road bicycle racer, who last rode for UCI Professional Continental Team . He is the 2005 under-23 national road race champion and the winner of 2010 Trofeo Franco Balestra. He turned professional in 2011, riding for the UCI ProTour team , but moved to RusVelo for the 2012 season.

Personal life
Mironov is married.  His hobbies include listening to music and spending time with the family. During his childhood he supported the cycling champion Miguel Indurain. He considers the 2010 Trofeo Franco Balestra as the best race ever.  He is also a fan of soccer and he supports Manchester United and Real Madrid.  His dream is to win the Tour de France.

Palmares

Sources:

2005
1st Stage 7 Bałtyk–Karkonosze Tour
1st National Under-23 Road Race Championships
3rd Overall Tour de la Guadeloupe
2007
2nd Overall Mayor Cup
3rd Overall Five rings of Moscow
2008
2nd Overall Paris–Troyes
1st Stage 4 Rhône-Alpes Isère Tour
2nd Overall Five rings of Moscow
1st Stage 1 Way to Pekin
2009
5th Overall Paris–Troyes
10th Overall Tour du Loir-Et-Cher
8th Overall Five rings of Moscow
1st Stage 2 Circuito Montañés
2010
7th Overall Wanzele
1st Trofeo Franco Balestra
6th Overall Tour de Normandie
1st Stage 6
2nd Overall Nogent-sur-Oise
1st Memorial Oleg Dyachenko
6th Overall GP of Moscow
4th Overall Five rings of Moscow
3rd National Road Race Championships
4th Overall Tour de Slovaquie

References

External links

 Alexander Mironov's Profile on Team Katusha
 Alexander Mironov at Cycling News

1984 births
Living people
Russian male cyclists
Tour de Guadeloupe cyclists
Sportspeople from Oryol